Epping Forest is a constituency represented in the House of Commons of the UK Parliament since 1997 by Eleanor Laing, a Conservative.

History 
The seat was created for the February 1974 general election, primarily from part of the abolished constituency of Chigwell, together with parts of the abolished constituency of Epping.

When Epping Forest was first created, it was more favourable to the Conservatives than the old Epping seat, as it lost the new town of Harlow (inside the old Epping Rural District) and gained the more Conservative Chigwell Urban District. During the Thatcher period the Labour Party's vote was crushed. Even though the Liberals managed to move into second place, their vote did little more than follow national trends and as soon as 1987 their votes dropped away as well.

Two former candidates in the Epping Forest constituency have also stood for election as Mayor of London: Steve Norris (Conservative; MP 1988–97) and Julian Leppert (British National Party).

Constituency profile
The constituency includes the London commuter belt towns of Loughton, Epping and Chigwell (which are served by the Central line) and Waltham Abbey, as well as extensive areas of Metropolitan Green Belt including the majority of Epping Forest itself.

Boundaries and boundary changes 

1974–1983: The Urban Districts of Chigwell, Epping, and Waltham Holy Cross, and in the Rural District of Epping and Ongar the parishes of Epping Upland, Theydon Bois, and Theydon Garnon.

The majority of the new constituency, comprising the Urban District of Chigwell (incorporating Buckhurst Hill and Loughton), had previously been part of the abolished constituency of Chigwell. Remaining parts had previously been in the abolished constituency of Epping.

1983–1997: The District of Epping Forest wards of Broadway, Buckhurst Hill East, Buckhurst Hill West, Chigwell Row, Chigwell Village, Debden Green, Epping Hemnall, Epping Lindsey, Grange Hill, High Beach, Loughton Forest, Loughton Roding, Loughton St John's, Loughton St Mary's, Paternoster, Theydon Bois, Waltham Abbey East, and Waltham Abbey West.

Minor loss to Brentwood and Ongar.

1997–2010: The District of Epping Forest wards of Broadway, Buckhurst Hill East, Buckhurst Hill West, Chigwell Row, Chigwell Village, Debden Green, Epping Hemnall, Epping Lindsey, Grange Hill, High Beach, Loughton Forest, Loughton Roding, Loughton St John's, Loughton St Mary's, North Weald Bassett, Paternoster, Theydon Bois, Waltham Abbey East, and Waltham Abbey West.

North Weald Bassett transferred from Harlow.

2010–present: The District of Epping Forest wards of Broadley Common, Epping Upland and Nazeing, Buckhurst Hill East, Buckhurst Hill West, Chigwell Row, Chigwell Village, Epping Hemnall, Epping Lindsey and Thornwood Common, Grange Hill, Loughton Alderton, Loughton Broadway, Loughton Fairmead, Loughton Forest, Loughton Roding, Loughton St John's, Loughton St Mary's, Theydon Bois, Waltham Abbey High Beach, Waltham Abbey Honey Lane, Waltham Abbey North East, Waltham Abbey Paternoster, and Waltham Abbey South West.

North Weald Bassett ward now transferred to Brentwood and Ongar. Other marginal changes due to redistribution of local authority wards.

The constituency comprises Loughton, Epping, Waltham Abbey, Chigwell, Buckhurst Hill, Theydon Bois, part of North Weald, small intermediate villages and almost the whole of the ancient Forest itself, except those parts which were transferred to Greater London in 1965.

Members of Parliament 
The constituency was created in 1974 from the seats of Epping and Chigwell — both of these (then one constituency, Epping) were represented by Winston Churchill throughout his tenure as Prime Minister during World War II. The Conservative Party has won in Epping Forest in every election since the creation of the constituency, and the present MP is the Conservative Dame Eleanor Laing, who has been a Deputy Speaker of the House since October 2013 and Chairman of Ways and Means since 2020.

Elections

Elections in the 2010s

Elections in the 2000s

Elections in the 1990s

Elections in the 1980s

Elections in the 1970s

Notional results (before 1974)

Graphical representation

See also
List of parliamentary constituencies in Essex

Notes

References

|-

Parliamentary constituencies in Essex
Constituencies of the Parliament of the United Kingdom established in 1974
Epping Forest District